Byzantium is a 2012 vampire film directed by Neil Jordan. The film stars Gemma Arterton, Saoirse Ronan, and Sam Riley.

Byzantium had its world premiere at the 2012 Toronto International Film Festival on 9 September 2012, and was released in the United Kingdom on 31 May 2013. The film received generally positive reviews.

Plot summary
In 2010, an old man, Robert Fowlds, picks up a discarded note dropped by teenage vampire Eleanor Webb, who has taken to writing her life story and then throwing the individual pages to the wind. Realising what she is, the old man invites Eleanor to his house and tells her that he is ready for death. Eleanor proceeds to kill him and consume his blood. Elsewhere, Eleanor's mother, Clara, is chased from the lap-dancing club where she has been working. Werner, a member of the vampiric Brethren, demands to know where Eleanor is and captures her after an extended chase. Clara decapitates Werner, burns his body and leaves town with her daughter.

Eleanor and Clara seek sanctuary in a dilapidated coastal resort. There, Clara sets her sights on a lonely soul named Noel, who has just inherited the Byzantium Hotel, a once-thriving business that has fallen into disrepair. Eleanor plays the piano in a restaurant and is approached by a young waiter named Frank, who takes a shine to her. Having seduced Noel, Clara turns the Byzantium into a makeshift brothel and Eleanor joins the local college which Frank also attends. Interested in her past, Frank questions Eleanor, who writes her story for him to read. Not entirely believing it, he shows it to their teacher, Kevin.

The story, revealed in a series of flashbacks over the course of the film, begins during the Napoleonic Wars, when a young Clara encounters two Royal Navy officers, Captain Ruthven and Midshipman Darvell. Much to the dismay of Darvell, Clara leaves with Ruthven, who forces her into prostitution after raping her. When Eleanor is born in 1804, Clara leaves her at a private orphanage. Years later, Clara is dying of what appears to be tuberculosis when the brothel is visited by Darvell, who has become a vampire. He gives Ruthven a map to an island where people can become vampires if they are willing to die. Clara shoots Ruthven in the leg, steals the map and makes her way to the island to become a vampire. Darvell finds Clara and takes her to the Brethren, a secret society of vampires that protects the secret of vampirism.

As their members have traditionally been male nobles, they are appalled that a low-born prostitute has joined their ranks but decide to spare her life, warning her that she must abide by their code but that she may play no part in their Brotherhood.  Clara, alone and desperate after her banishment, secretly visits Eleanor at night.  Shortly afterwards, Clara's decision to spare Ruthven comes back to haunt her, when the vengeful, syphilis-ridden Captain turns up at Eleanor's orphanage and drags her down to the basement to rape her. Clara brutally murders him but she is too late; Eleanor is condemned to a slow, painful death. Desperate to save her daughter's life, Clara takes Eleanor to the island and has her transformed into a vampire, violating the Brethren's code. The Brethren begin hunting Clara and Eleanor.

In the 21st century, Eleanor falls in love with Frank and decides to help him turn into a vampire so they can be together, since he is dying from leukaemia. Before killing him, Clara finds out from Kevin that Eleanor has told Frank of their past. Noel is accidentally killed, falling down the lift shaft, when Clara tries to prevent Eleanor from leaving the hotel and succeeds in trapping her in the lift. While Clara is out dealing with Frank, Darvell and Savella, the Brethren's leader, posing as police, find out from Kevin's colleague Morag where Clara is and go to kill her. Clara leaves without killing Frank when she realises that Eleanor is in mortal danger.

The Brethren kidnap Eleanor and drive her to an abandoned fairground to destroy her, only to be stopped by Clara. After killing Morag, Savella battles Clara and ultimately subdues her. Savella hands Darvell his sword, which he took from Byzantium during the Crusades, so he can kill Clara. Darvell, who has always harboured feelings for Clara, kills Savella instead. On the run again, Clara leaves with Darvell while Eleanor takes a weakened Frank to the island so he can become a vampire.

Cast
 Saoirse Ronan as Eleanor Webb
 Gemma Arterton as Clara Webb
 Sam Riley as Midshipman Darvell
 Jonny Lee Miller as Captain Ruthven
 Daniel Mays as Noel
 Caleb Landry Jones as Frank
 Tom Hollander as Kevin
 Maria Doyle Kennedy as Morag
 Warren Brown as Gareth
 Thure Lindhardt as Werner
 Uri Gavriel as Savella
 Kate Ashfield as Gabi
 Barry Cassin as Robert Fowlds

Release
The film premiered at the Irish Film Institute on 28 April 2013 with director Neil Jordan in attendance. It also received a red carpet screening in Hastings on 5 June 2013.

The film was shown at the Glasgow Film Festival in February 2013 with Neil Jordan, Saoirse Ronan, and Gemma Arterton in attendance.

The film was released in the United Kingdom on 31 May 2013, and received a limited release in North America on 28 June 2013.

Reception

Byzantium received generally positive reviews from film critics. , the film holds a 66% approval rating on Rotten Tomatoes, based on 120 reviews with an average rating of 6.4 out of 10. The site's consensus reads: "Director Neil Jordan remains as expert as ever when it comes to setting a chilling mood, but Byzantium struggles to match its creepily alluring atmosphere with a suitably compelling story." Metacritic gave the film a "generally favorable" score of 66 based on reviews from 22 sampled reviewers.

See also
 2012 in film
 Cinema of Ireland

References

External links
 Byzantium at BFI
 Byzantium at British Council–Film
  Byzantium at Lumiere
 
 
 
 
 Byzantium at Shot at Trinity (database of films shot at Trinity College Dublin)

2012 films
2012 fantasy films
2012 thriller films
2010s fantasy thriller films
2010s thriller films
American fantasy thriller films
American horror thriller films
British fantasy films
British thriller films
2010s English-language films
English-language Irish films
Irish fantasy films
Irish thriller films
American films based on plays
Films set in 2010
Films set in the 1800s
Films set in the 1810s
Films set in the 1820s
Films set in East Sussex
Films set in Ireland
Films about rape
American vampire films
Films directed by Neil Jordan
Films produced by Elizabeth Karlsen
Number 9 Films films
Films scored by Javier Navarrete
Films about mother–daughter relationships
2010s American films
2010s British films